The Mon National Liberation Army (abbreviated MNLA) is a Mon insurgent group in Myanmar (Burma). It is the armed wing of the New Mon State Party (NMSP), and has been fighting government forces since 1949, though under different names. The NMSP signed the Nationwide Ceasefire Agreement (NCA) on 15 October 2015 with several other insurgent groups and the government of Myanmar.

In September 2016, MNLA fighters began clashing with members of the Karen National Liberation Army (KNLA), the armed wing of the Karen National Union (KNU), in the Tanintharyi Region. Both the NMSP and the KNU were signatories of the NCA at the time of the fighting. A temporary bilateral truce was reached between the two groups on 14 March 2018.

NMSP began new clashes with KNLA in Mon State border with Kayin State in October 2019.

References

Politics of Myanmar
Mon State
Rebel groups in Myanmar
Independence movements
Secessionist organizations
Separatism in Myanmar